= Golden Cock and Hen =

Painting

- 《金黄公鸡与母鸡》 (Chinese)
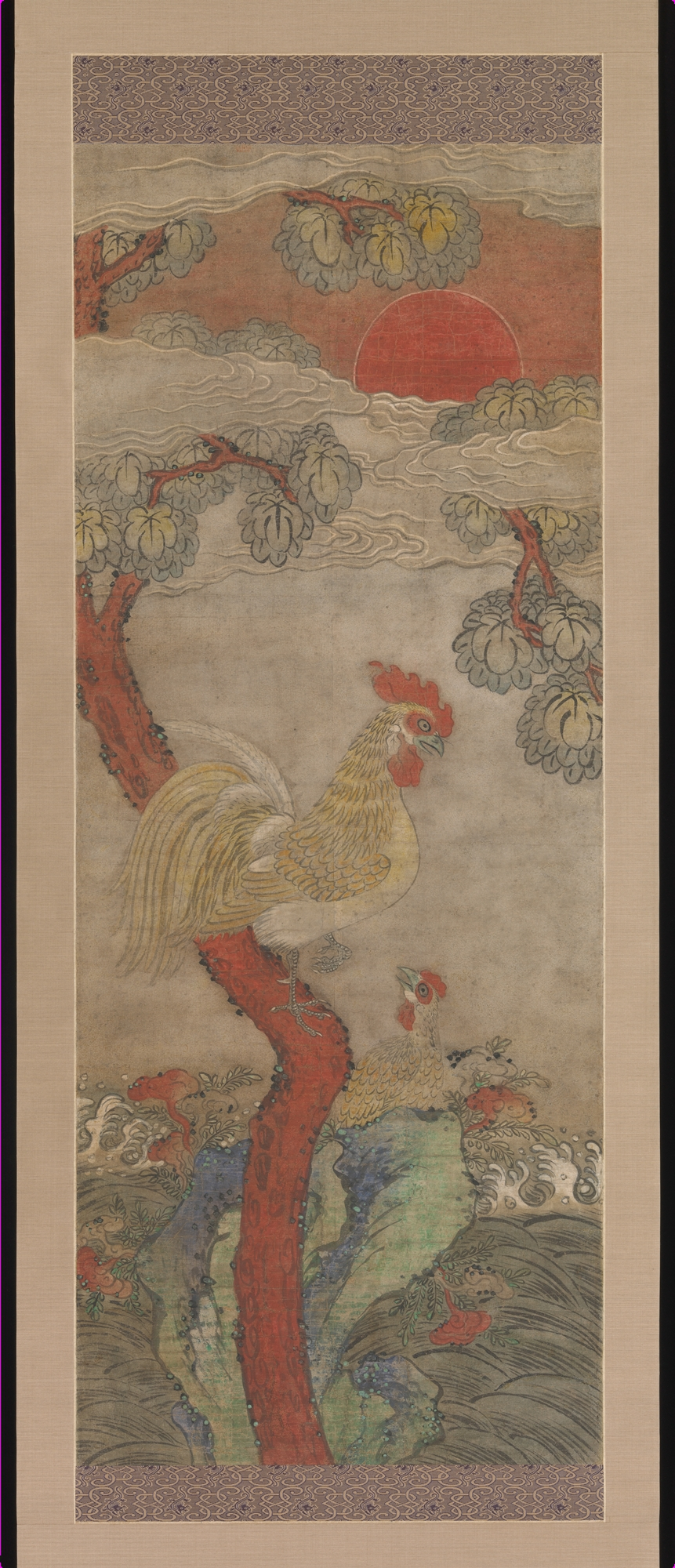
- Artist: unknown artist
- Year: 19th century (Joseon dynasty)
- Type: painting
- Medium: Hanging scroll, ink and colour on paper
- Dimensions: 114.3 cm × 45.7 cm (45.0 in × 18.0 in)
- Location: Metropolitan Museum of Art, New York
- Accession: 19.103.2

Golden Cock and Hen (Chinese: 《金黄公鸡与母鸡》) is a painting from Korea’s Joseon dynastic period. The painting, which belongs to the early 19th century, was painted by an unknown artist. The painting itself measures about 114.3 cm in height and 45.7 cm in width. With the decorative elements, the complete painting measures 200.7 cm in height and 62.9 cm in width. This painting represents a combination of two established themes of Korean painting: birds and flowers. Also it consists of ten symbols of longevity—the sun, mountains eater, rocks, clouds, pine trees, turtles, cranes, deer and mushrooms. In the central scene, there is a cock and hens perched on a tree and a rock respectively. This represents fortune and future. Currently, the painting is in the Metropolitan Museum of Art, New York, United States.

== Description ==
In the traditional Chinese culture, the rooster had been given a significant place. Ancient Chinese people believed that the rooster was a kind of moral animal with excellent qualities. This aspect also affected the neighboring Asian countries. In the Joseon dynasty of the Korean Peninsula, auspicious creatures such as the tiger, dragon, crane and deer were represented in a series of artworks demonstrating the importance and universality of these creatures in the Korean Art and culture. The painting, "Golden Cock and Hen" was created in the early 19th century AD, during Korean Peninsula’s Joseon dynasty. The painting itself measures 114.3 cm in height and 45.7 cm in width. With the external decorative elements, the complete piece measures 200.7 cm in height and 62.9 cm in width. Due to the lack of documentation, the artist and the specific creation date of the painting cannot be predicated.

In 1919, this painting was granted to the Metropolitan Museum of Art, New York by Rogers Foundation. Between 1984 and 2015 the painting has been displayed seven times in New York, New Orleans, Honolulu, San Francisco, Tulsa and Los Angeles.
